Michelle Murphy (born 1969) is a Canadian academic. She is a Professor of History and Women and Gender Studies at the University of Toronto and Director of the Technoscience Research Unit.

Murphy is well known for her work on regimes of imperceptibility, the ways in which different forms of knowledge become visible or invisible in the scientific community and broader society. Murphy has published several books, including Sick Building Syndrome and the Problem of Uncertainty: Environmental Politics, Technoscience, and Women Workers (2006) which won the Ludwik Fleck Prize from the Society for Social Studies of Science, Seizing the Means of Reproduction: Entanglements of Feminism, Health, and Technoscience (2012), and The Economization of Life (2017).

Early life and education
Claudette Michelle Murphy was born in 1969 and grew up in Winnipeg, Manitoba. Her family background includes Metis and French heritage.

Murphy was inspired by the work of feminists in science in the mid-eighties, including Donna Haraway and Ruth Hubbard. She earned a bachelor's degree in Biology and History and Philosophy of Science and Technology from the University of Toronto in 1992. She earned a Ph.D. from Harvard University in 1998. Her experience at Harvard led her to incorporate analysis of whiteness explicitly into her work on science.

In the 1990s, Murphy worked with Evelynn M. Hammonds and her working group on race and science at MIT. From 1996-2007, she edited RaceSci, a website on anti-racist studies in science, medicine, and technology. With Adele Clarke and others at the Society for the Social Studies of Science, she organized panels on race and science.

Career

Murphy is interested in asking the question "What can feminist technoscience be?" She studies the recent history of science and technology with particular attention to economics, capitalism, the environment, and reproduction, with an awareness of colonialism, feminism, gender, race, and queer theory.

She focuses on Canada, the United States, Bangladesh, and issues around chemical exposure, environmental justice, and reproductive justice. Landscapes of Exposure: Knowledge and Illness in Modern Environments, which she co-edited with Gregg Mitman and Chris Sellers in 2004, has been called  "a foundational volume in bringing historical and social science perspectives to bear on the intersection of place and disease."

Murphy is known for the concept of regimes of imperceptibility, a framework for examining the ways in which different forms of knowledge become visible or invisible within scientific communities and society.

She develops these ideas in Sick Building Syndrome and the Problem of Uncertainty: Environmental Politics, Technoscience, and Women Workers (2006). She traces the history of sick building syndrome (SBS), a diagnosis applied to mass health complaints by office workers for which no cause can be identified.  She closely examines the ways in which the identification of a new disease was affected by "a congeries of unlikely forces" including both scientific and social factors. The identification and acceptance of SBS, an inherently uncertain diagnosis, involves gender, race, and power dynamics within "normal science." This raises the question "How do we come to presence the effects of capitalism in our lives, and how are those effects invisibilized?"  She also looks at the presentation of information in ways that drew on traditions from the labor and feminist movements. The framework she introduces can be used by anthropological researchers for complex biopolitical analysis. She received the Ludwik Fleck Prize (2008) from the Society for Social Studies of Science for this book.

Murphy is also the author of Seizing the Means of Reproduction: Entanglements of Feminism, Health, and Technoscience (2012). Her starting point is the work of radical feminists in the United States in the 1970s and 1980s, who advocated for alternative health techniques and feminist clinics. She goes on to place these developments in a broader framework, examining relationships between feminism, imperialism, capitalism, population control, and neoliberalism. It is applauded for identifying critical junctures that were previously overlooked, and for its elegant examination of how the "economy of reproduction" operates in both developed and developing worlds. Murphy has said:

Murphy continues to work on "Distributed Reproduction," a theorization of reproduction that would extend beyond the individual.

Her book The Economization of Life (2017) explores the 20th century rise of techniques to value life based on economic and biopolitical concerns. Murphy examines the techniques and epistemologies that have been used to describe and connect ideas of populations and economics in the United States and Bangladesh. This book was awarded the Ludwik Fleck Prize, making Murphy the first person to receive the award multiple times. 

Murphy is also working on "Alterlife in the Ongoing Aftermaths of Industrial Chemicals," an examination of the transgenerational effects of environmental damage from industrial chemicals in the Great Lakes region.

Books

Awards
 Geddes W. Simpson Distinguished Lecturer, University of Maine, 2010
 Jackman Humanities Research Fellow, 2009-2010
 Ludwik Fleck Prize, Society for Social Studies of Science, 2008
 Michelle Clayman Gender Research Institute Senior Research Fellowship, Stanford, 2007-2008
Ludwik Fleck Prize, Society for Social Studies of Science, 2019 
Royal Society of Canada

References

1969 births
Living people
Historians of science
Philosophers of science
Canadian women historians
Canadian historians
Canadian philosophers
Canadian women philosophers
Harvard University alumni
University of Toronto alumni
Fellows of the Royal Society of Canada